Vincent Léotaud (1595 – 1672) was a French Jesuit mathematician.

In his work Examen circuli quadraturae he affirmed the impossibility of squaring the circle, against the opinion of Grégoire de Saint-Vincent.

Works

References 

1595 births
1672 deaths
17th-century French Jesuits
17th-century French mathematicians